Neil Gillman (September 11, 1933 – November 24, 2017) was a Canadian-American rabbi and philosopher affiliated with Conservative Judaism.

Biography
Gillman was born in Quebec City, Canada. He graduated from McGill University in 1954. He was ordained as a rabbi at the Jewish Theological Seminary of America in 1960. He received his Ph.D. in philosophy from Columbia University in 1975.

In Conservative Judaism
Gilman was a member of the Conservative movement's rabbinical body, the Rabbinical Assembly, and was a professor of Jewish philosophy at the Jewish Theological Seminary of America, in Manhattan, New York City, USA.

Gillman was one of the members of the Conservative movement's commission which produced Emet Ve-Emunah ("Truth and Faith"), the first official statement of beliefs of Conservative Judaism.

Books
Believing and Its Tensions: A Personal Conversation about God, Torah, Suffering and Death in Jewish Thought, Jewish Lights, 2013.
Doing Jewish Theology: God, Torah and Israel in Modern Judaism, Jewish Lights, 2008.
Traces of God: Seeing God in Torah, History and Everyday Life, Jewish Lights, 2006.
The Jewish Approach to God: A Brief Introduction for Christians, Jewish Lights, 2003.
The Way into Encountering God in Judaism, Jewish Lights, 2000.
The Death of Death: Resurrection and Immortality in Jewish Thought, Jewish Lights, 1997.
Conservative Judaism: The New Century, Behrman House, 1993.
Sacred Fragments: Recovering Theology for the Modern Jew, Jewish Publication Society, 1992.
Gabriel Marcel on Religious Knowledge, Rowman & Littlefield Publishers, 1980.

Awards 

 1991: National Jewish Book Award in the Jewish Thought category for Sacred Fragments: Recovering Theology for the Modern Jew

See also

American philosophy
List of American philosophers

References

External links
 The Problematics of Myth
 Torah From Terror (Edited with Rabbi Jason Miller)
 Neil Gillman at the Jewish Theological Seminary.

1933 births
2017 deaths
American philosophers
Jewish Theological Seminary of America semikhah recipients
Philosophers of Judaism
American Conservative rabbis
American Jewish theologians
20th-century American rabbis
21st-century American rabbis